KMTI (650 AM) is a radio station broadcasting a country music format. Licensed to Manti, Utah, United States, the station is currently owned by Sanpete County Broadcasting Company.

KMTI's skywave signal has been reported in Salt Lake City, Utah, Green River, Wyoming and even as far away as Ventura, California and Flagstaff, Arizona.

KMTI is broadcasting on 95.1 FM via translator K236BE, licensed to Manti, on 100.9 FM via translator K265, licensed to Nephi, on 102.1 FM via translator K271DB, licensed to Gunnison, and on 106.7 FM via translator K294DH, licensed to Joseph.

References

External links

Official station website

MTI
Country radio stations in the United States